Abū l-Fatḥ ʿUthmān ibn Jinnī, best known as Ibn Jinnī, was a specialist on Arabic grammar, a philologist, and a philosopher of language. He was born in Mosul to a Greek Christian slave of a certain Sulayman ibn Fahd ibn Ahmad al-Azdi.

References

10th-century philologists
10th-century philosophers
Arab people of Greek descent
People from Mosul
Philologists
Linguists
Year of birth uncertain
1002 deaths
People from the Hamdanid emirate of Aleppo
Medieval grammarians of Arabic
Mu'tazilites